An Inspector Calls is a 2015 British thriller television film written by Helen Edmundson, based on the J. B. Priestley 1945 play of the same name. It is directed by Aisling Walsh, produced by Howard Ella and stars David Thewlis as the titular character. The story is centred on a mysterious inspector, who investigates the socially ambitious Birling family and a dinner guest following the suicide of a young woman. The film was first broadcast on 13 September 2015 on BBC One.

Plot
The film is set in 1912 and follows the events of a single evening on which the wealthy Birling family is holding a dinner party to celebrate the engagement of their daughter, Sheila, to Gerald Croft. The festivities are then interrupted by a visit from what is taken to be a policeman, Inspector Goole, who is investigating the recent suicide of a local young woman named Eva Smith. Goole’s interrogations of each member of the dinner party make it clear that all of them have contributed to the tragedy through individually unjust, selfish or exploitative behaviour. The "Inspector" leaves the subdued group with a warning that human beings have shared responsibility for each other and that this lesson will soon be taught "in fire and blood and anguish"—an apparent reference to the outbreak of World War I two years later.

Final scenes establish that Goole is not a real policeman, and suggest that he is some form of supernatural messenger.

Cast
 David Thewlis as Inspector Goole
 Sophie Rundle as Eva Smith/Daisy Renton/Mrs Birling/Alice Grey
 Chloe Pirrie as Sheila Birling
 Finley Cole as Eric Birling
 Miranda Richardson as Sybil Birling
 Ken Stott as Arthur Birling
 Kyle Soller as Gerald Croft
 Lucy Chappell as Edna
 Flora Nicholson as Miss Francis
 Gary Davis as Alderman Meggarty
 Wanda Opalinska as Charity Lady

Production
In February 2015, filming began in Saltaire, West Yorkshire. Although the exterior shots of the mill were filmed at Saltaire, the interior shots of the mill were filmed at Queen Street Mill on the outskirts of Burnley, Lancashire. A full-sized office was built in the middle of the Weaving Shed for this production and was dismantled once filming was completed.
A large number of scenes were also filmed at Scampston Hall, near Malton, and in the market town of Malton. The exterior is Attingham House.

Like the 1954 version, this adaptation employs flashbacks to the events described (allowing some dialogue to be eliminated), as well as additional scenes showing more of the life and death of Eva, and the Inspector after he leaves the Birlings' home.

Critical reception
The programme was watched by nearly six million viewers. For The Daily Telegraph, Anita Singh was generally positive, writing that the programme was 'as good an adaptation as it could be' and praising Helen Edmundson for her 'decent job of expanding the drama'.

The Guardian’s Sam Wollaston was positive in his review, writing that Priestley’s 'play might be set over a hundred years ago, in 1912, but the messages and sentiments – about social responsibility and a shared humanity – remain important and relevant...An Inspector Calls, sensitively adapted here by Helen Edmundson, time-travels remarkably well: it translates into gripping 21st-century television.'

References

External links
 

2010s crime drama films
2015 films
2015 television films
BBC television dramas
British crime films
British films based on plays
British mystery films
British thriller television films
Films scored by Dominik Scherrer
Films set in 1912
Films set in Yorkshire
Films shot in Yorkshire
Helen Edmundson
2010s English-language films
2010s British films